Mixed-member proportional representation (MMP or MMPR) is a mixed electoral system in which votes cast are considered in local elections and also to determine overall party vote tallies, which are used to allocate additional members to produce or deepen overall proportional representation.

In some MMP systems, voters get two votes: one to decide the representative for their single-seat constituency, and one for a political party. In Denmark and others, the single vote cast by the voter is used for both the local election (in a multi-member or single-seat district), and for the overall top-up.

Seats in the legislature are filled first by the successful constituency candidates, and second, by party candidates based on the percentage of nationwide or region-wide votes that each party received. 

The constituency representatives are usually elected using first-past-the-post voting (FPTP) but the Scandinavian countries have a long history of using both multi-member districts (members elected through party-list PR) and nationally-based compensatory top-up seats. 

The nationwide or regional party representatives are, in most jurisdictions, drawn from published party lists, similar to party-list proportional representation. To gain a nationwide representative, parties may be required to achieve a minimum number of constituency seats, a minimum percentage of the nationwide party vote, or both.

MMP differs from parallel voting in that the nationwide seats are allocated to political parties in a compensatory manner in order to achieve proportional election results. Under MMP, two parties that each receive 25% of the votes end up with about 25% of the seats, even if one party wins more constituency seats than the other. Depending on the exact system implemented in a country and the results of a particular election, the proportionality of an election may vary. Overhang seats may reduce the proportionality of the system, although this can be compensated for by allocating additional party list seats to cover any proportionality gap.

MMP was first used to elect representatives to the German Bundestag, and has been adopted by South Korea, New Zealand, and others. In Germany, where it is used on the federal level and in most states, MMP is known as personalized proportional representation. 

In the Canadian province of Quebec, where an MMP model was studied in 2007, it is called the compensatory mixed-member voting system ( or SMAC). In the United Kingdom the semi-proportional implementation of MMP used in Scotland, Wales, and the London Assembly is referred to as the additional member system. 

MMP produces proportional election results by a number of compensatory seats, sometimes known as leveling seats.

Some countries use single vote variants of MMP. But this article focuses primarily on dual vote versions of MMP.

Procedures 

In MMP, the voter casts two votes: one for a constituency representative and one for a party. In the original variant used in Germany, citizens gave only one vote, so that voting for a representative automatically meant also voting for the representative's party, which is still used in some MMP elections today. Most of Germany changed to the two-vote variant to make local members of parliament (MPs) more personally accountable. Voters can thus vote for the local person they prefer for local MP without regard for party affiliation, since the partisan make-up of the legislature is determined only by the party vote. In the 2017 New Zealand election, 27.33% of voters split their vote (voted for a local candidate of a different party than their party vote) compared to 31.64% in 2014.

In each constituency, the representative is chosen using a single winner method, typically first-past-the-post (that is, the candidate with the most votes, by plurality, wins).

Most systems used closed party lists to elect the non-constituency MPs (also called list MPs). In most jurisdictions, candidates may stand for both a constituency and on a party list (referred to in New Zealand as dual candidacy). In Wales between 2006 and 2014 dual candidacy was banned, i.e. candidates were restricted to contend either for a constituency or for a party list, but not both. If a candidate is on the party list, but wins a constituency seat, they do not receive two seats; they are instead crossed off the party list and the party seat goes to the next candidate down.

In Bavaria, the second vote is not simply for the party but for one of the candidates on the party's regional list: Bavaria uses seven regions for this purpose.  A regional open-list method was recommended for the United Kingdom by the Jenkins Commission (where it is known as AMS) and for Canada by the Law Commission of Canada; neither recommendation was ever implemented.

In contrast, the open-list method of MMP was chosen in November 2016 by voters in the 2016 Prince Edward Island electoral reform referendum.

In Baden-Württemberg, there are no lists; they use the "best near-winner" method in a four-region model, where the regional members are the local candidates of the under-represented party in that region who received the most votes in their local constituency without being elected in it (Zweitmandat, literally "second mandate").

Calculation methods
At the regional or national level (i.e. above the constituency level) several different calculation methods have been used, but the basic characteristic of the MMP is that the total number of seats in the assembly, including the single-member seats and not only the party-list ones, are allocated to parties proportionally to the number of votes the party received in the party portion of the ballot. This can be done by the largest remainder method or either of two highest averages methods: the D'Hondt method or the Sainte-Laguë method. Subtracted from each party's allocation is the number of constituency seats that party won, so that the additional seats are compensatory (top-up).

If a party wins more FPTP seats than the proportional quota received by the party-list vote, these surplus seats are called overhang seats ( in German), which may be an obstacle to achieving full proportionality. To combat disproportionalities caused by overhang seats, in most German states, and federally since 2013, leveling seats (Ausgleichsmandate in German) are added to compensate for the overhang seats and thereby achieve complete proportionality.

Dealing with overhang seats

When a party wins more constituency seats than it would be entitled to from its proportion of (party list) votes, most systems allow for these overhang seats to be kept by those candidates who earned it in the constituency elections. A counter-example would be the an MMP variant used in Romania in the 2008 and 2012 legislative elections, where constituency seats could only be earned by the winning candidate if they also achieved an absolute majority in their district, thereby eliminating overhang seats.

In Germany's Bundestag and the New Zealand House of Representatives, all members elected for constituencies keep their seats. For example, in the 2008 New Zealand general election the Māori Party won 2.4% of the party vote, which would entitle them to 3 seats in the House, but won 5 constituency seats, leaving an overhang of 2 seats, which resulted in a 122-member house. If the party vote for the Māori Party had been more in proportion with the constituency seats won, there would have been a normal 120-member house.

In most German states, and in the federal Bundestag since 2013, the other parties receive extra seats (leveling seats) to create full proportionality. For example, the provincial parliament (Landtag) of North Rhine Westphalia has, instead of the usual 50% compensatory seats, only 29% unless more are needed to balance overhangs. If a party wins more local seats than its proportion of the total vote justifies, the size of the Landtag increases so that the total outcome is fully proportional to the votes, with other parties receiving additional list seats to achieve proportionality. The leveling seats are added to the normal number of seats for the duration of the electoral period. In the German state of Bavaria, the constituency vote and party vote are combined to determine the distribution of seats.

In one election in Scotland, the highest averages method resulted in a majority government for the Scottish National Party with only 44% of the party vote. However, Scotland uses the term Additional Member System, which does not use levelling seats like other MMP systems, and therefore is sometimes less than perfectly proportional. In Scotland and Wales, due to the nature of the calculations used to distribute the regional list seats, overhang seats are not possible. The list allocation for those parliaments works like a mixed-member majoritarian system, but in using the d'Hondt method's divisors to find the averages for the allocation, the first divisor for each party takes into account the number of constituency seats won by the party; i.e. a party that won 7 constituency seats would start with a divisor of 8 (7 seats + 1 per the method's divisor formula) instead of 1. The resulting table would then give 7 seats for Scotland and 4 seats for Wales to the parties possessing the highest averages on the table, although both devolved parliaments do not use a table, instead using a sequential method. The compensatory effect characteristic of MMP is in the fact that a party that won constituency seats would have lower averages on the table than it would if the election used MMM. Because of no provision for overhang seats, there have been cases where a party ended up with fewer total seats than its proportional entitlement. This occurred, for example, in the elections in the South East Wales electoral region in both 2007 (Welsh Conservatives under-represented) and in 2016 (Welsh Labour over-represented, Plaid Cymru under-represented). Labour has also been over-represented on this basis in every election in the South Wales West region, and every election in the South Wales Central region apart from  the 2003 election. This situation arises because Labour has continued to hold the overwhelming majority of constituency seats in these regions, and only around one-third of the total number of seats are available for distribution as additional regional seats.

Threshold

As in numerous proportional systems, in order to be eligible for list seats in many MMP models, a party must earn at least a certain percentage of the total party vote, or no candidates will be elected from the party list. Candidates having won a constituency will still have won their seat. In New Zealand the threshold is 5%, in Bolivia 3%, in Germany 5% for elections for federal parliament and most state parliaments. A party can also be eligible for list seats if it wins at least three constituency seats in Germany, or at least one in New Zealand. Having a member with a 'safe' constituency seat is therefore a tremendous asset to a minor party in New Zealand.

In elections for the Scottish Parliament and Welsh Assembly, there is no threshold set, because the district magnitude of each electoral region is small enough to impose an inherent threshold in the seat distribution calculations.

Countries using MMP

Current and former use

Proposals for use

Canada
In March 2004, the Law Commission of Canada proposed a system of MMP, with only 33% of MPs elected from regional open lists, for the House of Commons of Canada but Parliament's consideration of the Report in 2004–5 was stopped after the 2006 election.

The New Democratic Party has been a longtime supporter of MMP. The Green Party of Canada has generally been a staunch supporter of a move to a proportional electoral system.

A proposal to adopt MMP with closed province-wide lists for elections to the Legislative Assembly of Prince Edward Island was defeated in a referendum in 2005.

In 2007, the Citizens' Assembly on Electoral Reform in Ontario, Canada, also recommended the use of MMP in future elections to the Legislative Assembly of Ontario, with a ballot similar to New Zealand's, and with the closed province-wide lists used in New Zealand but with only 30% compensatory members. A binding referendum on the proposal, held in conjunction with the provincial election on 10 October 2007, saw it defeated.

In June 2016, the Canadian House of Commons Special Committee on Electoral Reform was formed to examine potential changes to the voting system with MMP being one of the options examined. The committee presented its report to Parliament on 1 December of the same year. In early 2017, the Government announced that it would accept only some of the committee's recommendations, and would not pursue the issue of electoral reform any further.

In a non-binding plebiscite between 27 October and 7 November 2016, Prince Edward Islanders voted for MMP over FPTP in the final round of counting, 52%–43%; however, the provincial government, despite having set no voter turnout threshold, subsequently claimed that the 36 percent turnout was insufficient to change the electoral system. A second referendum, held simultaneously with the provincial election, saw MMP rejected by a margin of 48% in favor to 52% against, with 76% turnout.

During October–December 2018, British Columbia held a referendum on proportional representation, promised as part of the election platform of the British Columbia New Democratic Party who took office following the May 2017 provincial election. In the referendum citizens were presented with two questions. The first question asked them to choose whether they would like to keep first-past-the-post voting or change to proportional representation. The second question asked them to rank three types of proportional voting systems in order of preference; one of those was MMP. Citizens could still rank the voting systems even if they selected first-past-the-post voting in the first question. According to official results, voters chose FPTP over PR by 61.3% to 38.7% on the first question. While the first question was not successful for PR, the second question resulted in MMP winning over the two other systems on the ballot. If PR had been successful on the first question, MMP would have been adopted in time for the next provincial election and would have been subject to a second referendum after two election cycles.

In September 2019, Quebec's government, supported by two of the three opposition parties (PQ and Quebec Solidaire), introduced a referendum on MMP to be held in 2022.  However, On April 28, 2021, Justice Minister Sonia LeBel informed a legislative committee hearing that the government would not move forward with a referendum on electoral reform in 2022. LeBel blamed the COVID-19 pandemic for altering the government's timeline and could not or would not commit to providing an alternate date for the referendum, effectively ending discussions about electoral reform in Quebec.

Costa Rica 

Currently Costa Rica was debating the switch from the current closed party list proportional representation system to a mixed member proportional representation based on the German model. The bill presented by the Citizen Power Now movement and endorsed by the majority of parliamentary groups would create two types of deputies; 42 elected proportionally by lists presented by the political parties and would be called "national" deputies, while another 42 deputies would be elected directly by population-based electoral districts on a First pass the post basis. As the bill requires a constitutional reform it would require a two-thirds majority of votes, however as of 2019 the caucuses of the four main parties support the reform.

European Union (European Parliament) 
The pan-European party VOLT Europa proposes transnational mixed-member proportional representation with the combination of Majority Judgment and party-list PR.

Sri Lanka
In September 2015, Sri Lankan Foreign Minister Mangala Samaraweera announced that they will change the country's system to MMP.

South Africa
In South Africa, MMP is generally referred to as a "mixed-system". The Mbeki administration's Van Zyl Slabbert Commission on Electoral Reform (January 2003) recommended that a multi-member system, which has been adopted for local/regional level elections, be expanded to national parliamentary (lower house) elections. It proposed that 300 of 400 members be elected from closed-constituency lists (from 69 national multi-member constituencies) and 100 members from closed, national-level party lists. Parliament's High Level Panel report of 2017, chaired by former president Kgalema Motlanthe, validated the Van Zyl Slabbert mixed-system and recommended its adoption, stating: "Such a system will serve to limit the power of individual party leaders and encourage MPs to vote in accordance with the needs and desires of their constituencies rather than only following party lines". Although a constitutional amendment is not required, and a simple majority in parliament can amend the Electoral Act (No. 73 of 1998) it seems unlikely that such an amendment will come before parliament before the 2019 General Elections. A former MP, Dr Michael Louis, who wishes to stand as an independent, is actively pursuing a judicial route to force an amendment. The Independent Electoral Commission (IEC) has stated that it is not opposed to an amendment but there is simply not enough time to implement it in time for the 2019 elections.

After the Constitutional Court of South Africa declared the Electoral Act unconstitutional in 2020 because there was no way for independent candidates to be elected and in 2021, Home Affairs Minister Aaron Motsoaledi told Parliament that a new electoral system must be put in place, calls for MMP intensified and a Motsoaledi-appointed, Valli Moosa-led ministerial advisory committee was formed to determine the new system.

Tactical manipulation

Split ticket voting 
In other cases, a party may be so certain of winning a large number of constituency seats that it expects no extra seats in the proportional top-up (list seats). Some voters may therefore seek to achieve double representation by voting tactically for another party in the regional vote, as a vote for their preferred party in the regional vote would be wasted. This tactic is much less effective in MMP models with a relatively large share of list seats (50% in most German states, and 40% in the New Zealand House of Representatives) and/or ones which add "balancing seats", leading to fewer opportunities for overhangs and maintaining full proportionality, even when a party wins too many constituency seats.

Solutions 
The problem of ticket splitting strategies can be solved either by eliminating at least one of the two mechanism that create the opportunity for abuse: Either the double vote can be abolished, returning to a mixed single vote (the original version of MMP used in Germany), in which case voters cannot split their ticket, even if it is a sincere preference. Another solution is to eliminate the seat linkage mechanism and use a vote linkage one instead, in which case most likely more compensatory seats would be needed. A negative vote transfer based system (scorporo) retains the flaw that decoy lists can be used to abuse it, but if the two votes were tied in a mixed ballot transferable vote, the potential this kind of strategic manipulation would be eliminated. However, in this a case party proportionality is not likely and overall equality of votes would depend largely on the specifics of the system (the amount of compensation).

Splitting parties
This sort of strategy for a coalition of parties to capture a larger share of list seats may be adopted formally as a strategy. By way of example, in Albania's 2005 parliamentary election, the two main parties did not expect to win any list seats, so they encouraged voters to use their list votes for allied minor parties. This tactic distorted the working of the model to the point that the parties that won list seats were almost always different from the parties that won constituency seats. Only one constituency member was elected from parties that won list seats. The election was condemned by the Organization for Security and Co-operation in Europe which said it failed to comply with international standards because of "serious irregularities", intimidation, vote-buying and "violence committed by extremists on both sides." Rather than increasing the number of list seats or "overhang" seats, Albania subsequently decided to change to a pure-list system.

In an abusive gambit similar to that used in Albania, major parties feeling that they are unlikely to win a large number of list seats because of their advantage at the constituency level might choose to split their party in two, with one subdivision of the party contesting the constituency seats, while the other contests the list seats—assuming this is allowed by electoral law. The two linked parties could then co-ordinate their campaign and work together within the legislature, while remaining legally separate entities. The result of this approach, if it is used by all parties, would be to transform MMP into a de facto parallel voting mechanism.

An example of how this could happen manifested itself in the 2007 Lesotho general election. In this case the two leading parties, the Lesotho Congress for Democracy (LCD) and the All Basotho Convention (ABC) used decoy lists, respectively named the National Independent Party and the Lesotho Workers' Party to avoid the compensatory mechanisms of MMP. As a result, the LCD and its decoy were able to take 69.1% of the seats with only 51.8% of the vote. ABC leader Tom Thabane called the vote "free, but not fair." In the 2012 election, the voting system was adjusted to link the local and list seats to limit the decoy lists' effectiveness, resulting in an almost perfectly proportionate election result for the competing parties.

Another interesting case is that of Venezuela, which also ended up changing its system, in this case by formally adopting a parallel voting system and legitimizing party efforts to game the MMP approach. Venezuela introduced an MMP electoral system in 1993, but the tactic of creating a decoy party was introduced only in 2000, by the opposition governor of Yaracuy. The tactic was later adopted by pro-Chavez parties at the national level in 2005. After the decoy list tactic withstood a constitutional challenge, Venezuela eventually formally reverted to a parallel voting system, which yields a lesser degree of proportionality compared to MMP. On September 26, 2010, Chavez' party, the United Socialist Party of Venezuela, took 57.4% of parliamentary seats with only 48.2% of the vote under the new system (ignoring the role of small allied parties). One can see to what extent parallel voting had nonetheless helped to redress the balance toward proportionality somewhat by noting that Chavez' party would have taken an even larger share of assembly seats under a strict single-winner approach (71 constituency seats out of 109, or 65%).

Another example is that of the 2001 Italian general election, in which one of the two main coalitions (the House of Freedoms), which opposed the scorporo system (a system compensatory system similar to MMP), linked many of their constituency candidates to a decoy list in the proportional parts, under the name . As a defensive move, the other coalition, Olive Tree, felt obliged to do the same, under the name . This meant that the constituency seats won by each coalition would not reduce the number of list seats available to them. In the case the House of Freedoms list faction Forza Italia, the tactic was so successful that it did not have enough candidates in the proportional part to receive as many seats as it in fact won, missing out on 12 seats. Italy subsequently changed its system.

Ahead of the 2020 South Korean legislative election, the electoral system was changed from parallel voting to a hybrid mixed-member proportional system, with 30 seats allocated in a compensatory manner. The opposition Liberty Korea Party subsequently set up a decoy list, the Future Korea Party, to win extra proportional seats. The ruling Democratic Party of Korea condemned them for exploiting the electoral law, but nonetheless set up its own decoy list, the Platform Party, in response. The decoy lists were successful on election day, with Future Korea winning 12 compensatory seats and Platform winning 11. After the election, both decoy lists merged into their mother parties.

Electoral thresholds 
In systems with a threshold, people who prefer a larger party may tactically vote for a minor party that is predicted to poll close to or slightly below the threshold. Some voters may be afraid the minor party will poll below the threshold, and that that would weaken the larger political camp to which the minor party belongs. For example, the German moderate-right Free Democratic Party (FDP) has often received votes from voters who preferred the larger Christian Democratic Union (CDU) party, because they feared that if the FDP received less than 5% of the votes, the CDU would have no parliamentary allies and would be unable to form a government on its own. This tactical voting also ensures that fewer votes are wasted, but at the cost of giving the FDP more seats than CDU voters would ideally have preferred. This tactic is the same in any method of proportional representation with a threshold.

Similarly, in New Zealand, some voters who preferred a large party have voted for the minor party's local candidate to ensure it qualifies for list seats on the back of winning a single electorate. This notably occurred in the right-wing inner Auckland electorate of Epsom in 2008 and 2011, where the National Party voters gave their local vote to the ACT Party. In this case the tactic maintained some proportionality by bypassing the 5% threshold, but is largely disfavoured by the public due to it awarding smaller parties extra list seats while parties with a higher party vote percentage that do not win an electorate receive no seats; this occurred in 2008 when ACT was awarded 5 seats on the back of one electorate seat and 3.7% of the party vote, while New Zealand First with no electorate seats and 4.1% of the party vote were awarded none. In 2011, some Epsom voters voting for the left-wing Labour and Green parties tried to block the tactic by giving their local vote to the National candidate; while it was unsuccessful, it did reduce ACT's majority over National from 12,900 to 2,300. In August 2012, the initial report on a review of the MMP system by the Electoral Commission recommended abolishing the one electorate seat threshold, meaning a party winning an electorate seat but not crossing the 5% threshold (which the same report recommends lowering to 4%) is only awarded that electorate seat.

See also

 Additional member system, MMP as implemented in the United Kingdom
 Alternative Vote Plus
 Leveling seat
 Mixed single vote
 Mixed ballot transferable vote
 Dual-member proportional
 Biproportional apportionment

References

Notes

Bibliography

Further reading

 Malone, R. (2008). Rebalancing the Constitution: The Challenge of Government Law-Making under MMP. Institute of Policy Studies, Victoria University of Wellington: Wellington, New Zealand.
 Massicotte, Louis; Blais, André (1999). "Mixed Electoral Systems: A Conceptual and Empirical Survey", Electoral Studies, Vol. 18, 341–366.
 Mudambi, R. and Navarra, P. 2004. Electoral Strategies in Mixed Systems of Representation. European Journal of Political Economy, Vol.20, No.1, pp. 227–253.
 Shugart, S. Matthew and Martin P. Wattenberg, (2000a), "Mixed-Member Electoral Systems: A Definition and Typology", in Shugart, S. Matthew and Martin P. Wattenberg (2000). Mixed-Member Electoral Systems: The Best of Both Worlds?'' Oxford: Oxford University Press, pp. 9–24.

External links
ACE Project: "Germany: The original MMP system" 
A Handbook of Electoral System Design from International IDEA
Electoral Design Reference Materials from the ACE Project
Scottish Social Attitudes Survey, 2003.
 Handbook of Electoral System Choice

Videos
 6 min. video (2015). Explains how MMP (recommended by the Law Commission of Canada) could work in Canada – Presented by the nonpartisan Fair Vote Canada's Dennis Pilon, Associate Professor, Political Science, York University

Party-list proportional representation
Mixed electoral systems
Proportional representation electoral systems
Electoral systems
Electoral reform in Canada